This is a list of hurlers who have received a winners' medal in the Munster Senior Hurling Championship.

Currently, the Munster Council of the Gaelic Athletic Association issues medals limited to the winning team, however, the individual county board has the option of ordering extra medals for members of the extended panel or for players who may have played during the championship but missed the final due to injury.

Players

2006-present

External links
 List of Munster Senior Hurling Championship winning teams

Winners
Winners